The Crimson Flash is a 1927 American action film serial directed by Arch Heath. The film is now considered to be lost.

Cast
 Cullen Landis
 Eugenia Gilbert
 Thomas Holding (as Tom Holding)
 J. Barney Sherry
 Walter P. Lewis
 Ivan Linow
 Mary Gardner
 Charles Anthony Hughes as Dale (as Tony Hughes)
 Gus De Weil
 Ed Roseman
 Howard Carey

See also
 List of film serials
 List of film serials by studio

References

External links

1927 films
1927 lost films
1920s action films
American action films
American silent serial films
American black-and-white films
Pathé Exchange film serials
Lost American films
Lost action films
Films directed by Arch Heath
1920s American films
Silent action films